Frances Joan Davidson, Viscountess Davidson, Baroness Northchurch,  (née Dickinson; 29 May 1894 – 25 November 1985), styled Lady Davidson between 1935 and 1937 and as Viscountess Davidson between 1937 and 1985, was a British Conservative Party politician.

Background and education
She was the daughter of Sir Willoughby Dickinson, later Baron Dickinson. Her father, grandfather and great-grandfather were all Members of Parliament. She was educated at Kensington High School and Northfields, Englefield Green.

Career
During World War I, she served in the Red Cross POW Department and was appointed OBE in 1919. When her husband, Sir J. C. C. Davidson, was created Viscount Davidson in 1937, she was elected at a by-election to succeed him as Conservative Member of Parliament (MP) for Hemel Hempstead. She held the seat until she retired from the House of Commons at the 1959 general election. For a short time after the 1945 general election, she was the only female Conservative MP.

Honours and arms
She was appointed a Dame Commander of the Order of the British Empire (DBE) in the 1952 Birthday Honours and created a life peer as Baroness Northchurch, of Chiswick in the County of Middlesex, on 13 January 1963. She and her husband were one of the few couples who both held titles in their own right.

Family
Davidson had two sons and two daughters (Margaret, Jean, Andrew and Malcolm). She died aged 91, from natural causes. Both sons inherited their father's title, as Andrew Davidson, 2nd Viscount Davidson and Malcolm Davidson, 3rd Viscount Davidson.

References

External links

1894 births
1985 deaths
Female members of the Parliament of the United Kingdom for English constituencies
British viscountesses
Conservative Party (UK) MPs for English constituencies
Dames Commander of the Order of the British Empire
Daughters of barons
Life peeresses created by Elizabeth II
People from Kensington
Conservative Party (UK) life peers
UK MPs 1935–1945
UK MPs 1945–1950
UK MPs 1950–1951
UK MPs 1951–1955
UK MPs 1955–1959
UK MPs who were granted peerages
Place of birth missing
Place of death missing
20th-century British women politicians
20th-century English women
20th-century English people
Davidson
Wives of knights
Spouses of British politicians